Castnius asteropoides is a moth in the Castniidae family. It is endemic to Peru.

References

Moths described in 2004
Endemic fauna of Peru
Castniidae
Moths of South America